Verve is the first EP by English rock band Verve, released in December 1992 on Vernon Yard Recordings in the United States and Hut Records in the United Kingdom. Two singles from the EP would reappear on the B-side compilation No Come Down ("Gravity Grave") and the singles compilation This Is Music: The Singles 92–98 ("Gravity Grave" and "She's a Superstar").

The EP captures the Verve's early style of experimental psychedelic rock.

The cover was shot in Richard Ashcroft's flat in Wigan. The person on the cover is Ashcroft's then-girlfriend Sarah Carpenter.

Track listing
"Gravity Grave" (edit) – 4:27
"A Man Called Sun" – 5:45
"She's a Superstar" (edit) – 5:03
"Endless Life" – 5:32
"Feel" – 10:42

Singles
 "She's a Superstar" (June 22, 1992)
 "Gravity Grave" (October 5, 1992)

Personnel
The Verve
 Richard Ashcroft – vocals
 Nick McCabe – guitar
 Simon Jones – bass
 Peter Salisbury – drums
Technical
 All tracks produced by Barry Clempson except "A Man Called Sun"
 "A Man Called Sun" produced and mixed by Paul Schroeder
 Mixed by Barry Clempson and Tony Harris, Paul Schroeder ("A Man Called Sun")
 Photography by Michael Spencer Jones 
 Sleeve concept and design by Brian Cannon for Microdot

References

External links

Verve at YouTube (streamed copy where licensed)

The Verve albums
1992 debut EPs